Euphaedra ruspina, or the common orange forester, is a butterfly in the family Nymphalidae. It is found in Ghana (the Volta Region), Togo, southern Nigeria, Cameroon, Gabon, the Republic of the Congo, the Central African Republic, Angola, the Democratic Republic of the Congo, western Uganda, north-western Tanzania and Zambia. The habitat consists of forests.

Adults mimic day-flying moths, including Aletis helcita, Phaegorista similis, Heraclia poggei, Weymeria athenae and Oethrodea papilionaris.

Similar species
Other members of the Euphaedra eleus species group q.v.

References

Butterflies described in 1865
ruspina
Butterflies of Africa
Taxa named by William Chapman Hewitson